Parkside is a suburb of Timaru, in the Timaru District and Canterbury Region of New Zealand's South Island.

The suburb includes the Timaru Botanic Gardens, a garden reserve officially set aside in 1867. The garden started being planted in 1868 and was put under the care of a ranger in 1872.

Timaru Hospital is located on the north-eastern corner of the Botanic Gardens. It is a public hospital operated by South Canterbury District Health Board, which provides medical, mental health, children's health, maternity and surgical services.

The suburb has one designated park, Anzac Square. It also has three smaller pockets of reserve land: Alexandra Square, Russell Square and Boer War Memorial Park.

Demographics

Parkside had a population of 2,376 at the 2018 New Zealand census, an increase of 18 people (0.8%) since the 2013 census, and an increase of 81 people (3.5%) since the 2006 census. There were 1,053 households. There were 1,182 males and 1,197 females, giving a sex ratio of 0.99 males per female. The median age was 40.7 years (compared with 37.4 years nationally), with 420 people (17.7%) aged under 15 years, 474 (19.9%) aged 15 to 29, 1,035 (43.6%) aged 30 to 64, and 447 (18.8%) aged 65 or older.

Ethnicities were 87.9% European/Pākehā, 11.7% Māori, 2.8% Pacific peoples, 5.3% Asian, and 1.8% other ethnicities (totals add to more than 100% since people could identify with multiple ethnicities).

The proportion of people born overseas was 12.6%, compared with 27.1% nationally.

Although some people objected to giving their religion, 51.1% had no religion, 36.0% were Christian, 0.9% were Hindu, 0.5% were Muslim, 0.3% were Buddhist and 2.4% had other religions.

Of those at least 15 years old, 183 (9.4%) people had a bachelor or higher degree, and 564 (28.8%) people had no formal qualifications. The median income was $27,400, compared with $31,800 nationally. 198 people (10.1%) earned over $70,000 compared to 17.2% nationally. The employment status of those at least 15 was that 966 (49.4%) people were employed full-time, 255 (13.0%) were part-time, and 69 (3.5%) were unemployed.

Education
The school opened in 1881 as an extension of Timaru Main School. It merged with Pareora East School in 2004 and kept both campuses until 2018.

It opened in 1880, initially sharing a site with Timaru Boys' High School but separated by a fence.

It was created by the 1982 merger of Mercy College (established 1935 as Sacred Heart College) and St Patrick's High School (established 1938).

Rolls are as of

References

Suburbs of Timaru